Knarvik Church is a parish church of the Church of Norway in Alver Municipality in Vestland county, Norway. It is located in the village of Knarvik. It is one of the four churches for the Knarvik parish which is part of the Nordhordland prosti (deanery) in the Diocese of Bjørgvin. The wooden church was built in a modern long church design in 2014 using plans drawn up by the architectural firm Reiulf Ramstad Arkitekter. The church seats about 500 people.

History
Work on the church site began on 3 November 2012, and on 15 September 2013 the Bishop Halvor Nordhaug laid the foundation stone during a church service on the construction site. The church council budgeted  for the church. The church was designed by the firm of Reiulf Ramstad Arkitekter. The modern-style church was consecrated on 30 November 2014. The exterior of the building features the markedly rising roofs of the spire, church sanctuary, and chapel.

Media gallery

See also
List of churches in Bjørgvin

References

Alver (municipality)
Churches in Vestland
Long churches in Norway
Wooden churches in Norway
21st-century Church of Norway church buildings
Churches completed in 2014
2014 establishments in Norway